Kevin Kelly (born c. 1960) is an American football coach. He served as the head football coach at Georgetown University from 2006 to 2013, compiling a record of 24–63. Kelly was the defensive coordinator at Marshall University from 1996 to 1998 and 2000 to 2001.

Coaching career
In January 2006, Kelly was hired as the head football coach at Georgetown University.  He resigned from the position in January 2014 to become the defensive coordinator at Ball State University.

In 2019, he was named linebackers coach for the New York Guardians of the XFL.

Head coaching record

College

References

Living people
1960s births
American football linebackers
Ball State Cardinals football coaches
Bowdoin Polar Bears football coaches
Bryant Bulldogs football coaches
Dartmouth Big Green football coaches
Georgetown Hoyas football coaches
Marshall Thundering Herd football coaches
Navy Midshipmen football coaches
New York Guardians coaches
Northeastern Huskies football coaches
Southern Connecticut State Owls football coaches
Springfield Pride football players
Syracuse Orange football coaches
Tulane Green Wave football coaches
High school football coaches in Massachusetts
High school football coaches in New York (state)
High school football coaches in Pennsylvania